Quad City Knock is the debut album by Southern rap group 95 South, released in April 1993. It peaked at No. 71 on the Billboard 200 albums chart. The single, "Whoot, There It Is", peaked at No. 11 on the Billboard Hot 100. It was produced mostly by the production duo of Jay Ski and C.C. Lemonhead, who would go on to form the 69 Boyz and Quad City DJ's.

Track listing 
All tracks are written by McGowan and N. Orange, except where noted. Produced by Bass Mechanics for Purple Productions.

WRAP CD 
The 1993 WRAP Records CD release lacks the Ultimix of "Whoot! There It Is", containing only the original album version. "Booty Man Battle" and "95 South in da House" are added as track 13 and track 15 respectively. The printed media lists "K-Knock in da House" and "We Got da Bass" as separate tracks, giving a total of 18, despite the audio data combining these as above, giving an actual total of 17 tracks.

References

External links 
  (WRA 8117-CD)

1993 debut albums
95 South albums